Straight Branch is a stream in Ralls County in the U.S. state of Missouri. It is a tributary of Spencer Creek.

Straight Branch was so named on account of its relatively straight watercourse.

See also
List of rivers of Missouri

References

Rivers of Ralls County, Missouri
Rivers of Missouri